Freraea is a genus of bristle flies in the family Tachinidae.

Species
Freraea gagatea Robineau-Desvoidy, 1830
Freraea montana (Coquillett, 1897)

References

Diptera of Europe
Dexiinae
Tachinidae genera
Taxa named by Jean-Baptiste Robineau-Desvoidy